Hydeout Productions 2nd Collection is a compilation album published by Japanese label Hydeout Productions in 2007. Mainly a Nujabes album, it features numerous other hip hop and downtempo artists including Pase Rock, Uyama Hiroto, and Shing02. It was Nujabes' last album before his death in 2010.
The album cover image is a painting by Texas artist, Cheryl D. McClure.

Track listing

References

2007 compilation albums
Albums produced by Nujabes
Hip hop compilation albums
Nujabes albums